The names  or  came to be applied in Nazi Germany to research into nuclear technology - including nuclear weapons and nuclear reactors - before and during World War II. Development took place in several phases, but in the words of historian Mark Walker, it ultimately became "frozen at the laboratory level" with the "modest goal" to "build a nuclear reactor which could sustain a nuclear fission chain reaction for a significant amount of time and to achieve the complete separation of at least tiny amount of the uranium isotopes". The scholarly consensus is that it failed to achieve these goals, and that despite fears at the time, the Germans had never been close to producing nuclear weapons.

A second effort began under the administrative purview of the 's  on 1 September 1939, the day of the invasion of Poland. Eventually, it was assessed by the German military that nuclear fission would not contribute significantly to ending the war, and in January 1942 the  turned the program over to the Reich Research Council while continuing to fund the activity. The program was split up among nine major institutes where the directors dominated the research and set their own objectives. Subsequently, the number of scientists working on applied nuclear fission began to diminish, with many researchers applying their talents to more pressing wartime demands.

The most influential people in the  included Kurt Diebner, Abraham Esau, Walther Gerlach, and Erich Schumann. Schumann was one of the most powerful and influential physicists in Germany. Diebner, throughout the life of the nuclear weapon project, had more control over nuclear-fission research than did Walther Bothe, Klaus Clusius, Otto Hahn, Paul Harteck, or Werner Heisenberg. Esau was appointed as  Hermann Göring's plenipotentiary for  nuclear-physics research in December 1942; Walther Gerlach succeeded him after Esau resigned in December 1943.

Politicization of German academia under the Nazi régime of 1933-1945 had driven many physicists, engineers, and mathematicians out of Germany as early as 1933. Those of Jewish heritage who did not leave were quickly purged from German institutions, further thinning the ranks of researchers. The politicization of the universities, along with the  German armed forces' demands for manpower (many scientists and technical personnel were conscripted, despite possessing technical and engineering skills), substantially reduced the number of able German physicists.

With the war in Europe coming to an end in 1945, various  Allied powers competed with each other to obtain surviving components of the German nuclear industry (personnel, facilities, and materiel), as they did with the pioneering V-2 SRBM program.

Discovery of nuclear fission

In December 1938, German chemist Otto Hahn and his assistant Fritz Strassmann sent a manuscript to the German science journal Naturwissenschaften ("Natural Sciences") reporting that they had detected and identified the element barium after bombarding uranium with neutrons. Their article was published on 6 January 1939. On 19 December 1938, eighteen days before the publication, Otto Hahn communicated these results and his conclusion of a bursting of the uranium nucleus in a letter to his colleague and friend Lise Meitner, who had fled Germany in July to the Netherlands and then to Sweden. Meitner and her nephew Otto Robert Frisch confirmed Hahn's conclusion of a bursting and correctly interpreted the results as "nuclear fission" – a term coined by Frisch. Frisch confirmed this experimentally on 13 January 1939.

First Uranverein
On 22 April 1939, after hearing a colloquium paper by Wilhelm Hanle proposing the use of uranium fission in a Uranmaschine (uranium machine, i.e., nuclear reactor), Georg Joos, along with Hanle, notified Wilhelm Dames, at the Reichserziehungsministerium (REM, Reich Ministry of Education), of potential military applications of nuclear energy. The group included the physicists Walther Bothe, Robert Döpel, Hans Geiger, Wolfgang Gentner (probably sent by Walther Bothe), Wilhelm Hanle, Gerhard Hoffmann, and Georg Joos; Peter Debye was invited, but he did not attend. After this, informal work began at the Georg-August University of Göttingen by Joos, Hanle, and their colleague Reinhold Mannkopff; the group of physicists was known informally as the first Uranverein (Uranium Club) and formally as Arbeitsgemeinschaft für Kernphysik. The group's work was discontinued in August 1939, when the three were called to military training.

Other 1939 initiatives
Paul Harteck was director of the physical chemistry department at the University of Hamburg and an advisor to the Heereswaffenamt (HWA, Army Ordnance Office). On 24 April 1939, along with his teaching assistant Wilhelm Groth, Harteck made contact with the Reichskriegsministerium (RKM, Reich Ministry of War) to alert them to the potential of military applications of nuclear chain reactions. This initiative led, later in the year, to the Second Uranverein. Two days earlier, Joos and Hanle had approached the REM, leading to the First Uranverein.

The industrial firm Auergesellschaft had a substantial amount of "waste" uranium from which it had extracted radium. After reading a June 1939 paper by Siegfried Flügge, on the technical use of nuclear energy from uranium, Nikolaus Riehl, the head of the scientific headquarters at Auergesellschaft, recognized a business opportunity for the company, and in July he went to the HWA (Heereswaffenamt, Army Ordnance Office) to discuss the production of uranium. The HWA was interested and Riehl committed corporate resources to the task. The HWA eventually provided an order for the production of uranium oxide, which took place in the Auergesellschaft plant in Oranienburg, north of Berlin.

Second Uranverein
 
The second Uranverein began after the HWA squeezed out the Reichsforschungsrat (RFR, Reich Research Council) of the REM and started the formal German nuclear weapons project under military auspices. This second Uranverein was formed on 1 September 1939, the day World War II began, and had its first meeting on 16 September 1939. The meeting was organized by Kurt Diebner, advisor to the HWA, and held in Berlin. The invitees included Walther Bothe, Siegfried Flügge, Hans Geiger, Otto Hahn, Paul Harteck, Gerhard Hoffmann, Josef Mattauch, and Georg Stetter. A second meeting was held soon thereafter and included Klaus Clusius, Robert Döpel, Werner Heisenberg, and Carl Friedrich von Weizsäcker. Also at this time, the Kaiser-Wilhelm Institut für Physik (KWIP, Kaiser Wilhelm Institute for Physics, after World War II the Max Planck Institute for Physics), in Berlin-Dahlem, was placed under HWA authority, with Diebner as the administrative director, and the military control of the nuclear research commenced.

Heisenberg said in 1939 that the physicists at the (second) meeting said that "in principle atomic bombs could be made.... it would take years.... not before five." He said, "I didn't report it to the Führer until two weeks later and very casually because I did not want the Führer to get so interested that he would order great efforts immediately to make the atomic bomb. Speer felt it was better that the whole thing should be dropped and the Führer also reacted that way." He said they presented the matter in this way for their personal safety as the probability (of success) was nearly zero, but if many thousands (of) people developed nothing, that could have "extremely disagreeable consequences for us." So we turned the slogan around to make use of warfare for physics not "make use of physics for warfare." Erhard Milch asked how long America would take and was told 1944 though the group between ourselves thought it would take longer, three or four years.

When it was apparent that the nuclear weapon project would not make a decisive contribution to ending the war in the near term, control of the KWIP was returned in January 1942 to its umbrella organization, the Kaiser-Wilhelm Gesellschaft (KWG, Kaiser Wilhelm Society, after World War II the Max-Planck Gesellschaft). HWA control of the project was subsequently passed to the RFR in July 1942. The nuclear weapon project thereafter maintained its kriegswichtig (war importance) designation, and funding continued from the military, but it was then split into the areas of uranium and heavy water production, uranium isotope separation, and the Uranmaschine (uranium machine, i.e., nuclear reactor). It was in effect broken up between institutes where the different directors dominated the research and set their own research agendas. The dominant personnel, facilities, and areas of research were:

Walther BotheDirector of the Institut für Physik (Institute for Physics) at the Kaiser-Wilhelm Institut für medizinische Forschung (KWImF, Kaiser Wilhelm Institute for Medical Research, after 1948 the Max-Planck-Institut für medizinische Forschung), in Heidelberg.
Measurement of nuclear constants. 6 physicists
Klaus ClusiusDirector of the Institute for Physical Chemistry at the Ludwig Maximilian University of Munich
Isotope separation and heavy water production. ca. 4 physical chemists and physicists
Kurt DiebnerDirector of the HWA Versuchsstelle (testing station) in Gottow and of the RFR experimental station in Stadtilm, Thuringia; he was also an advisor to the HWA on nuclear physics.
Measurement of nuclear constants. ca. 6 physicists
Otto HahnDirector of the Kaiser-Wilhelm-Institut für Chemie (KWIC, Kaiser Wilhelm Institute for Chemistry, after World War II the Max Planck Institut für ChemieOtto Hahn Institut), in Berlin-Dahlem.
Transuranic elements, fission products, isotope separation, and measurement of nuclear constants. ca. 6 chemists and physicists
Paul HarteckDirector of the Physical Chemistry Department of the University of Hamburg.
Heavy water production and isotope production. 5 physical chemists, physicists, and chemists
Werner HeisenbergDirector of the Department of Theoretical Physics at the University of Leipzig until summer 1942; thereafter acting director of the Kaiser-Wilhelm-Institut für Physik (Kaiser Wilhelm Institute for Physics), in Berlin-Dahlem.
Uranmaschine, isotope separation, and measurement of nuclear constants. ca. 7 physicists and physical chemists
Hans KopfermannDirector of the Second Experimental Physics Institute at the Georg-August University of Göttingen.
Isotope separation. 2 physicists
Nikolaus RiehlScientific Director of the Auergesellschaft.
Uranium production. ca. 3 physicists and physical chemists
Georg StetterDirector of the II. Physikalisches Institut (Second Physics Institute) at the University of Vienna.
Transuranic elements and measurement of nuclear constants. ca. 6 physicists and physical chemists

The point in 1942 when the army relinquished control of the project was its zenith in terms of the number of personnel devoted to the effort, and this was no more than about seventy scientists, with about forty devoting more than half their time to nuclear fission research. After this the number diminished dramatically, and many of those not working with the main institutes stopped working on nuclear fission and devoted their efforts to more pressing war related work.

On 4 June 1942, a conference regarding the project, initiated by Albert Speer as head of the "Reich Ministry for Armament and Ammunition" (RMBM:  Reichsministerium für Bewaffnung und Munition; after late 1943 the Reich Ministry for Armament and War Production), decided on its continuation merely for the aim of energy production. On 9 June 1942, Adolf Hitler issued a decree for the reorganization of the RFR as a separate legal entity under the RMBM; the decree appointed Reich Marshal Hermann Göring as its president. The reorganization was done under the initiative of Minister Albert Speer of the RMBM; it was necessary as the RFR under Bernhard Rust the Minister of Science, Education and National Culture was ineffective and was not achieving its purpose. The hope was that Göring would manage the RFR with the same discipline and efficiency as he had the aviation sector. A meeting was held on 6 July 1942 to discuss the function of the RFR and set its agenda. The meeting was a turning point in National Socialism's attitude towards science, as well as recognition that the policies which drove Jewish scientists out of Germany were a mistake, as the Reich needed their expertise. Abraham Esau was appointed on 8 December 1942 as Hermann Göring's Bevollmächtigter (plenipotentiary) for nuclear physics research under the RFR; in December 1943, Esau was replaced by Walther Gerlach. In the final analysis, placing the RFR under Göring's administrative control had little effect on the German nuclear weapon project.

Speer states that the project to develop the atom bomb was scuttled in the autumn of 1942. Though the scientific solution was there, it would have taken all of Germany's production resources to produce a bomb, and then no sooner than 1947. Development did continue with a "uranium motor" for the navy and development of a German cyclotron. However, by the summer of 1943, Speer released the remaining 1200 metric tons of uranium stock for the production of solid-core ammunition.

Over time, the HWA and then the RFR controlled the German nuclear weapon project. The most influential people were Kurt Diebner, Abraham Esau, Walther Gerlach, and Erich Schumann. Schumann was one of the most powerful and influential physicists in Germany. He was director of the Physics Department II at the Frederick William University (later, University of Berlin), which was commissioned and funded by the Oberkommando des Heeres (OKH, Army High Command) to conduct physics research projects. He was also head of the research department of the HWA, assistant secretary of the Science Department of the OKW, and Bevollmächtigter (plenipotentiary) for high explosives. Diebner, throughout the life of the nuclear weapon project, had more control over nuclear fission research than did Walther Bothe, Klaus Clusius, Otto Hahn, Paul Harteck, or Werner Heisenberg.

Isotope separation
Paul Peter Ewald, a member of the Uranverein, had proposed an electromagnetic isotope separator, which was thought applicable to 235U production and enrichment. This was picked up by Manfred von Ardenne, who ran a private research establishment.

In 1928, von Ardenne had come into his inheritance with full control as to how it could be spent, and he established his private research laboratory the Forschungslaboratorium für Elektronenphysik, in Berlin-Lichterfelde, to conduct his own research on radio and television technology and electron microscopy. He financed the laboratory with income he received from his inventions and from contracts with other concerns. For example, his research on nuclear physics and high-frequency technology was financed by the Reichspostministerium (RPM, Reich Postal Ministry), headed by Wilhelm Ohnesorge. Von Ardenne attracted top-notch personnel to work in his facility, such as the nuclear physicist Fritz Houtermans, in 1940. Von Ardenne had also conducted research on isotope separation. Taking Ewald's suggestion he began building a prototype for the RPM. The work was hampered by war shortages and ultimately ended by the war.

Aside from the Uranverein and von Ardenne's team in Berlin-Lichterfelde, there was also a small research team in the Henschel Flugzeugwerke: the study group under the direction of Prof. Dr. Ing. Herbert Wagner (1900–1982) searched for alternative sources of energy for airplanes and became interested in nuclear energy in 1940. In August 1941, they finished a detailed internal survey of the history and potential of technical nuclear physics and its applications (Übersicht und Darstellung der historischen Entwicklung der modernen technischen Kernphysik und deren Anwendungsmöglichkeit sowie Zusammenfassung eigener Arbeitsziele und Pläne, signed by Herbert Wagner and Hugo Watzlawek (1912–1995) in Berlin. Their application to the Aviation Ministry (RLM) to found and fund an Institute for Nuclear Technology and Nuclear Chemistry (Reichsinstituts für Kerntechnik und Kernchemie) failed, but Watzlawek continued to explore potential applications of nuclear energy and wrote a detailed textbook on technical nuclear physics. It includes one of the most detailed presentations of contemporary German knowledge about the various processes of isotope separation, and recommends their combined usage to get to sufficient amounts of enriched uranium. Walther Gerlach refused to print this textbook, but it is preserved as a typed manuscript and it appeared after the War in 1948 virtually unchanged (with just a few additions on the US atomic bomb released in 1945). In October 1944, Hugo Watzlawek wrote an article on the potential usage of nuclear energy and its many potential applications. In his view, to follow up this route of research and development was the "new pathway" to becoming the "Master of the World". It is thus a mistake to focus only on the efforts of the Uranverein—other research groups in Germany were also active in research to exploit nuclear energy, especially for military purposes.

Moderator production
The production of heavy water was already under way in Norway when the Germans invaded on 9 April 1940. The Norwegian production facilities for heavy water were quickly secured (though some heavy water had already been removed) and improved by the Germans. The Allies and Norwegians had sabotaged Norwegian heavy water production and destroyed stocks of heavy water by 1943.

Graphite (carbon) as an alternative was not considered, because the neutron absorption coefficient value for carbon calculated by Walther Bothe was too high, probably due to the boron in the graphite pieces having high neutron absorption.

Exploitation and denial strategies
Near the end of World War II, the principal Allied war powers each made plans for exploitation of German science. In light of the implications of nuclear weapons, German nuclear fission and related technologies were singled out for special attention. In addition to exploitation, denial of these technologies, their personnel, and related materials to rival allies was a driving force of their efforts. This typically meant getting to these resources first, which to some extent put the Soviets at a disadvantage in some geographic locations easily reached by the Western Allies, even if the area was destined to be in the Soviet zone of occupation by the Potsdam Conference. At times, all parties were heavy-handed in their pursuit and denial to others.

The best known US denial and exploitation effort was Operation Paperclip, a broad dragnet that encompassed a wide range of advanced fields, including jet and rocket propulsion, nuclear physics, and other developments with military applications such as infrared technology. Operations directed specifically towards German nuclear fission were Operation Alsos and Operation Epsilon, the latter being done in collaboration with the British. In lieu of the codename for the Soviet operation, it is referred to by the historian Oleynikov as the Russian "Alsos".

American and British
Berlin had been a location of many German scientific research facilities. To limit casualties and loss of equipment, many of these facilities were dispersed to other locations in the later years of the war.

Operation BIG
Unfortunately for the Soviets, the Kaiser-Wilhelm-Institut für Physik (KWIP, Kaiser Wilhelm Institute for Physics) had mostly been moved in 1943 and 1944 to Hechingen and its neighboring town of Haigerloch, on the edge of the Black Forest, which eventually became the French occupation zone. This move allowed the Americans to take into custody a large number of German scientists associated with nuclear research.

American Alsos teams carrying out Operation BIG raced through Baden-Wurttemburg near the war's end in 1945, uncovering, collecting, and selectively destroying Uranverein elements, including capturing a prototype reactor at Haigerloch and records, heavy water, and uranium ingots at Tailfingen. These were all shipped to the US for study and utilization in the US atomic program.

Nine of the prominent German scientists who published reports in Kernphysikalische Forschungsberichte as members of the Uranverein were picked up by Operation Alsos and incarcerated in England under Operation Epsilon: Erich Bagge, Kurt Diebner, Walther Gerlach, Otto Hahn, Paul Harteck, Werner Heisenberg, Horst Korsching, Carl Friedrich von Weizsäcker, and Karl Wirtz. Also incarcerated was Max von Laue, although he had nothing to do with the nuclear weapon project. Goudsmit, the chief scientific advisor to Operation Alsos, thought von Laue might be beneficial to the postwar rebuilding of Germany and would benefit from the high level contacts he would have in England.

Oranienburg plant
With the interest of the Heereswaffenamt (HWA, Army Ordnance Office), Nikolaus Riehl, and his colleague Günter Wirths, set up an industrial-scale production of high-purity uranium oxide at the Auergesellschaft plant in Oranienburg. Adding to the capabilities in the final stages of metallic uranium production were the strengths of the Degussa corporation's capabilities in metals production.

The Oranienburg plant provided the uranium sheets and cubes for the Uranmaschine experiments conducted at the KWIP and the Versuchsstelle (testing station) of the Heereswaffenamt (Army Ordnance Office) in Gottow. The G-1 experiment performed at the HWA testing station, under the direction of Kurt Diebner, had lattices of 6,800 uranium oxide cubes (about 25 tons), in the nuclear moderator paraffin.

Work of the American Operation Alsos teams, in November 1944, uncovered leads which took them to a company in Paris that handled rare earths and had been taken over by the Auergesellschaft. This, combined with information gathered in the same month through an Alsos team in Strasbourg, confirmed that the Oranienburg plant was involved in the production of uranium and thorium metals. Since the plant was to be in the future Soviet zone of occupation and the Red Army's troops would get there before the Western Allies, General Leslie Groves, commander of the Manhattan Project, recommended to General George Marshall that the plant be destroyed by aerial bombardment, in order to deny its uranium production equipment to the Soviets. On 15 March 1945, 612 B-17 Flying Fortress bombers of the Eighth Air Force dropped 1,506 tons of high-explosive and 178 tons of incendiary bombs on the plant. Riehl visited the site with the Soviets and said that the facility was mostly destroyed. Riehl also recalled long after the war that the Soviets knew precisely why the Americans had bombed the facility—the attack had been directed at them rather than the Germans.

French
From 1941 to 1947, Fritz Bopp was a staff scientist at the KWIP, and worked with the Uranverein. In 1944, when most of the KWIP was evacuated to Hechingen in Southern Germany due to air raids on Berlin, he went there too, and he was the Institute's Deputy Director there. When the American Alsos Mission evacuated Hechingen and Haigerloch, near the end of World War II, French armed forces occupied Hechingen. Bopp did not get along with them and described the initial French policy objectives towards the KWIP as exploitation, forced evacuation to France, and seizure of documents and equipment. The French occupation policy was not qualitatively different from that of the American and Soviet occupation forces, it was just carried out on a smaller scale. In order to put pressure on Bopp to evacuate the KWIP to France, the French Naval Commission imprisoned him for five days and threatened him with further imprisonment if he did not cooperate in the evacuation. During his imprisonment, the spectroscopist  , who had a better relationship with the French, persuaded the French to appoint him as Deputy Director of the KWIP. This incident caused tension between the physicists and spectroscopists at the KWIP and within its umbrella organization the Kaiser-Wilhelm Gesellschaft (Kaiser Wilhelm Society).

Soviet
At the close of World War II, the Soviet Union had special search teams operating in Austria and Germany, especially in Berlin, to identify and obtain equipment, material, intellectual property, and personnel useful to the Soviet atomic bomb project. The exploitation teams were under the Soviet Alsos and they were headed by Lavrentij Beria's deputy, Colonel General A. P. Zavenyagin. These teams were composed of scientific staff members, in NKVD officer's uniforms, from the bomb project's only laboratory, Laboratory No. 2, in Moscow, and included Yulij Borisovich Khariton, Isaak Konstantinovich Kikoin, and Lev Andreevich Artsimovich. Georgij Nikolaevich Flerov had arrived earlier, although Kikoin did not recall a vanguard group. Targets on the top of their list were the Kaiser-Wilhelm Institut für Physik (KWIP, Kaiser Wilhelm Institute for Physics), the Frederick William University (today, the University of Berlin), and the Technische Hochschule Berlin (today, the Technische Universität Berlin (Technical University of Berlin).

German physicists who worked on the Uranverein and were sent to the Soviet Union to work on the Soviet atomic bomb project included: , Robert Döpel, Walter Herrmann, Heinz Pose, Ernst Rexer, Nikolaus Riehl, and Karl Zimmer. Günter Wirths, while not a member of the Uranverein, worked for Riehl at the Auergesellschaft on reactor-grade uranium production and was also sent to the Soviet Union.

Zimmer's path to work on the Soviet atomic bomb project was through a prisoner of war camp in Krasnogorsk, as was that of his colleagues Hans-Joachim Born and Alexander Catsch from the Kaiser-Wilhelm Institut für Hirnforschung (KWIH, Kaiser Wilhelm Institute for Brain Research, today the Max-Planck-Institut für Hirnforschung), who worked there for N. V. Timofeev-Resovskij, director of the Abteilung für Experimentelle Genetik (Department of Experimental Genetics). All four eventually worked for Riehl in the Soviet Union at Laboratory B in Sungul'.

Von Ardenne, who had worked on isotope separation for the Reichspostministerium (Reich Postal Ministry), was also sent to the Soviet Union to work on their atomic bomb project, along with Gustav Hertz, Nobel laureate and director of Research Laboratory II at Siemens, Peter Adolf Thiessen, director of the Kaiser-Wilhelm Institut für physikalische Chemie und Elektrochemie (KWIPC, Kaiser Wilhelm Institute for Chemistry and Electrochemistry, today the Fritz Haber Institute of the Max-Planck Society), and Max Volmer, director of the Physical Chemistry Institute at the Berlin Technische Hochschule (Technical University of Berlin), who all had made a pact that whoever first made contact with the Soviets would speak for the rest. Before the end of World War II, Thiessen, a member of the Nazi Party, had Communist contacts. On 27 April 1945, Thiessen arrived at von Ardenne's institute in an armored vehicle with a major of the Soviet Army, who was also a leading Soviet chemist, and they issued Ardenne a protective letter (Schutzbrief).

Comparison to the Manhattan Project
The United States, British, and Canadian governments worked together to create the Manhattan Project that developed the uranium and plutonium atomic bombs.  Its success has been attributed to meeting all four of the following conditions:

A strong initial drive, by a small group of scientists, to launch the project.
Unconditional government support from a certain point in time.
Essentially unlimited manpower and industrial resources.
A concentration of brilliant scientists devoted to the project.

Even with all four of these conditions in place the Manhattan Project succeeded only after the war in Europe had been brought to a conclusion.

For the Manhattan Project, the second condition was met on 9 October 1941 or shortly thereafter. Germany for a long time was thought to have fallen short of what was required to make an atomic bomb. Mutual distrust existed between the German government and some scientists. By the end of 1941, it was already apparent that the German nuclear weapon project would not make a decisive contribution to ending the German war effort in the near term, and control of the project was relinquished by the Heereswaffenamt (HWA, Army Ordnance Office) to the Reichsforschungsrat (RFR, Reich Research Council) in July 1942.

As to condition four, the high priority allocated to the Manhattan Project allowed for the recruitment and concentration of capable scientists on the project. In Germany, on the other hand, a great many young scientists and technicians who would have been of great use to such a project were conscripted into the German armed forces, while others had fled the country before the war due to antisemitism and political persecution.

Whereas Enrico Fermi, a scientific Manhattan Project leader, had a "unique double aptitude for theoretical and experimental work" in the 20th century, the successes at Leipzig until 1942 resulted from the cooperation between the theoretical physicist Werner Heisenberg and the experimentalist Robert Döpel. Most important was their experimental proof of an effective neutron increase in April 1942. At the end of July of the same year, the group around Fermi also succeeded in the neutron increase within a reactor-like arrangement.

In June 1942, some six months before the American Chicago Pile-1 achieved man-made criticality for the first time anywhere, Döpel's L-IV "Uran-Maschine" was destroyed by a chemical explosion introduced by oxygen, which finished the work on this topic at Leipzig. Thereafter, despite increased expenditures, the Berlin groups and their extern branches did not succeed in getting a reactor critical until the end of World War II. However, this was realized by the Fermi group in December 1942, so that the German advantage was definitively lost, even with respect to research on energy production.

German historian Klaus Hentschel summarizes the organizational differences as:

Compared with the British and American war research efforts united in the Manhattan Project, to this day the prime example of "big science," the Uranverein was only a loosely knit, decentralized network of researchers with quite different research agendas. Rather than teamwork as on the American end, on the German side we find cut-throat competition, personal rivalries, and fighting over the limited resources.

In terms of financial and human resources, the comparisons between the Manhattan Project and the Uranverein are stark. The Manhattan Project consumed some US$2 billion (1945, ~US$ billion in  dollars) in government funds, and employed at its peak some 120,000 people, mostly in the sectors of construction and operations. Total, the Manhattan Project involved the labor of some 500,000 people, nearly 1% of the entire US civilian labor force. By comparison, the Uranverein was budgeted a mere 8 million reichsmarks, equivalent to about US$2 million (1945,~US$ million in  dollars) – one one-thousandth of the American expenditure.

See also

Germany and weapons of mass destruction
Japanese nuclear weapon program

References
Footnotes

Citations

Sources

 
 
 
  See also Letters to the Editor by Klaus Gottstein and a reply by Jeremy Bernstein in Am. J. Phys. 72 (9): 1143–45 (2004).
 
 
 
 (1967 interviews with Heisenberg, Harteck and others).
 
 
 
Hahn, Otto My Life (Herder and Herder, New York 1970)
 
Heisenberg, Werner Research in Germany on the Technical Applications of Atomic Energy, Nature Volume 160, Number 4059, 211–15 (16 August 1947). See also the annotated English translation: Document 115.
  [This book is a collection of 121 primary German documents relating to physics under National Socialism. The documents have been translated and annotated, and there is a lengthy introduction to put them into perspective.]
 
Hoffmann, Klaus Otto Hahn – Achievement and Responsibility (Springer, New York. 2001) 
 
 
 
 
 
 
 
  The author has been a group leader at the Institute of Technical Physics of the Russian Federal Nuclear Center in Snezhinsk (Chelyabinsk-70).

Further reading

Albrecht, Ulrich, Andreas Heinemann-Grüder, and Arend Wellmann Die Spezialisten: Deutsche Naturwissenschaftler und Techniker in der Sowjetunion nach 1945 (Dietz, 1992, 2001) 
 
Beyerchen, Alan What We Know About Nazism and Science, Social Research Volume 59, Number 3, 615–641 (1992)

 
Cassidy, David C. A Historical Perspective on Copenhagen, Physics Today Volume 53, Issue 7, 28 (2000). See also Heisenberg's Message to Bohr: Who Knows, Physics Today Volume 54, Issue 4, 14ff (2001), individual letters by Klaus Gottstein, Harry J. Lipkin, Donald C. Sachs, and David C. Cassidy.
Eckert, Michael Werner Heisenberg: controversial scientist physicsweb.org (2001)
 
Heisenberg, Werner Die theoretischen Grundlagen für die Energiegewinnung aus der Uranspaltung, Zeitschrift für die gesamte Naturwissenschaft, Volume 9, 201–212 (1943). See also the annotated English translation: Document 95. Werner Heisenberg.
Heisenberg, Werner, introduction by David Cassidy, translation by William Sweet A Lecture on Bomb Physics: February 1942, Physics Today Volume 48, Issue 8, Part I, 27–30 (1995)
Hentschel, Klaus The Mental Aftermath: The Mentality of German Physicists 1945–1949 (Oxford, 2007)
Hoffmann, Dieter Zwischen Autonomie und Anpassung: Die deutsche physikalische Gesellschaft im dritten Reich, Max-Planck-Institut für Wissenschafts Geschichte Preprint 192 (2001)
Hoffmann, Dieter and Mark Walker The German Physical Society Under National Socialism, Physics Today 57(12) 52–58 (2004)
Hoffmann, Dieter and Mark Walker Zwischen Autonomie und Anpassung, Physik Journal Volume 5, Number 3, 53–58 (2006)
Hoffmann, Dieter and Mark Walker Peter Debye: "A Typical Scientist in an Untypical Time" Deutsche Physikalische Gesellschaft (2006)
Hoffmann, Dieter and Mark Walker (editors) Physiker zwischen Autonomie und Anpassung (Wiley-VCH, 2007)
Karlsch Rainer Hitlers Bombe. Die geheime Geschichte der deutschen Kernwaffenversuche. (Dva, 2005)
Karlsch, Rainer and Heiko Petermann Für und wider "Hitlers Bombe" (Waxmann, 2007)
Krieger, Wolfgang The Germans and the Nuclear Question German Historical Institute Washington, D.C., Occasional Paper No. 14 (1995)
Pash, Boris T. The Alsos Mission (Award, 1969)
Rhodes, Richard The Making of the Atomic Bomb (Simon and Schuster, 1986)
Rife, Patricia, Lise Meitner: Ein Leben fuer die Wissenschaft (Dusseldorf: Claassen, 1990).
Rife, Patricia, Lise Meitner and the Dawn of the Nuclear Age (e-Book, Plunkett Lake Press, 2015) 
Rose, Paul Lawrence, Heisenberg and the Nazi Atomic Bomb Project: A Study in German Culture (California, 1998). For a critical review of this book, please see .
Schaaf, Michael Heisenberg, Hitler und die Bombe. Gespraeche mit Zeitzeugen. (GNT-Verlag, 2018)
Schumann, Erich Wehrmacht und Forschung in Richard Donnevert (editor) Wehrmacht und Partei second expanded edition, (Barth, 1939) 133–151. See also the annotated English translation: Document 75.
Walker, Mark National Socialism and German Physics, Journal of Contemporary Physics Volume 24, 63–89 (1989)
 Walker, Mark Heisenberg, Goudsmit and the German Atomic Bomb, Physics Today Volume 43, Issue 1, 52–60 (1990)
Walker, Mark German Work on Nuclear Weapons, Historia Scientiarum; International Journal for the History of Science Society of Japan, Volume 14, Number 3, 164–181 (2005)
Mark Walker Otto Hahn: Responsibility and Repression, Physics in Perspective Volume 8, Number 2, 116–163 (2006). Mark Walker is Professor of History at Union College in Schenectady, New York.

External links
 (February 2002) Aaserud, Finn Release of documents relating to 1941 Bohr-Heisenberg meeting
GlobalSecurity.org German Special Weapons
Niels Bohr Archive Release of documents relating to 1941 Bohr-Heisenberg meeting (6 February 2002)
 (June 2008) Annotated bibliography on the German atomic bomb project from the Alsos Digital Library for Nuclear Issues
Rife, Patricia, Lise Meitner and the Dawn of the Nuclear Age (Birkhauser/Springer Verlag, 1999)
Walker, Mark Nazis & the Bomb from Public Broadcasting Service Nova episode, Hitler's Sunken Secret (originally aired 8 November 2005).

 
 
World War II weapons of Germany
Nuclear weapons
Germany